Nord Anglia International School Shanghai, Pudong (NAIS Pudong) is an international school in Shanghai, China. The school opened in 2002 and has a sister campus in Puxi. The school was formerly known as The British International School Shanghai, Pudong Campus until 2015.

Academics are based on the English National Curriculum and the International Primary Curriculum for students in Early Years and Primary. Students in Secondary follow the English National Curriculum, with students in Year 10 and 11 undertaking the International General Certificate of Secondary Education and students in Years 12 and 13 following the International Baccalaureate Diploma Programme.

Established

The school was founded in 2002 by Nord Anglia Education which has its headquarters in Hong Kong. Nord Anglia Education operates 73 international, private and boarding schools in 29 countries across Asia, Europe, the Middle East and North and South America. These independent international schools teach over 67,000 pupils worldwide

Campus and location

The school started in 2002, with a small campus building and 50 pupils. The school grew rapidly, necessitating the construction of a 3-storey facility with bespoke gym and catering facilities in 2004. In 2007, further expansion saw the construction of two additional 3-storey buildings for secondary students, a theatre, swimming pool and additional gymnasium.

The school is located in Kangqiao, a suburb of Shanghai 10 km from the city centre.

Curriculum

NAIS Pudong caters for students from 12 months to 18 years. Students in Year 10 and 11 study for the IGCSE, and students in Year 12 and 13 follow the International Baccalaureate Diploma Programme.

Beyond the classroom

The school offers numerous opportunities to participate in Co-Curricular Activities (CCA's).

In early 2014, a group of students travelled to Tanzania to a Nord Anglia Education charity project school to help teach. The schools (Pudong and Puxi) are the only in Shanghai to offer this.
Since 2007, the school have been offering residential trips every year and in 2016, they allowed Year 4 students too. The community group helps make events annually such as Summer Fun Day, Christmas Bazzar, Temple Fair and more.

Accreditations

Nord Anglia International School Shanghai is accredited to offer the IB Diploma Programme (IBDP) and the International General Certificate of Secondary Education (IGSCE).

The school is also an accredited examination centre for the ABRSM, HSK, and YCT.

Special visitors

As a result of close links with the Shanghai community, the school often receives special guests. Previous visitors have included Tom Daley, Qiu Bo, Sarah Brennan, Flawless and Henry Evans. In 2014, students performed songs for the British Prime Minister, David Cameron at the UK-China trade mission to promote British businesses. In 2016, the UK National Space Academy visited the school and conducted a series of teacher and student masterclasses and workshops, plus a public lecture on space science. The Juilliard School from New York have been sending students to NAIS for lessons on different instruments

Summer school
The school holds an annual 4-week Summer School which is open to the Shanghai community. Activities include academic studies, sports and activities, arts and crafts, and a school musical production. The Summer School is attended by 130 students and taught by the school's qualified international school teachers.

See also

 List of international schools in Shanghai
 List of international schools

References

External links

 NAIS Pudong Website

British international schools in Shanghai
International Baccalaureate schools in China
Educational institutions established in 2002
Private schools in Shanghai
2002 establishments in China
Schools in Pudong